Kings of the West Coast is the debut studio album by LA Dream Team. It contains their best-known singles, "The Dream Team Is in the House" and "Nursery Rhymes". Kings of the West Coast was their only album to chart on the Billboard 200.

Critical reception

Ron Wynn of AllMusic said, "Rudy Pardee and Chris Wilson didn't become kings or even princes of the West Coast. They came a lot closer to enjoying court jester status, as their 1986 debut contained only one mildly entertaining number, 'Dream Team Is in the House'."

Track listing

Personnel 
 Jeff Adamoff – Art Direction
 The Real Richie Rich – Producer, Keyboards
 Courtney Branch – Producer, Engineer, mixing
 Tracy Kendrick – Producer, Engineer, mixing
 Ron Larson – Design
 Chris "Snake Puppy" Wilson – Lead Vocals, Drum Machine (Devastating High Velocity Beats)
 Michael Perison – Keyboards
 Rudy Pardee – Lead Vocals
 Aaron Rappoport – Photography
 L.A. Dream Team – Producer
 Bert "Mellow-B" Lopez – Keyboard Computer Programmer
 Christlynn Saulsbury – Female Vocals
 Diana Cacho – Female Vocals
 Kim Boyd – Female Vocals
 Shenitha Thomas – Female Vocals
 Lisette "Lisa Love" Rodriguez – Sexy Female Vocal

Charts

References

External links 
 Kings of the West Coast at iTunes
 Kings of the West Coast at West Coast Pioneers
 

1986 debut albums
MCA Records albums
West Coast hip hop
West Coast hip hop albums